Gifford Van Horn McDonald (August 16, 1890 – November 30, 1976) was a Negro leagues pitcher for several years before the founding of the first Negro National League.

References

External links
 and Baseball-Reference Black Baseball stats and Seamheads

Lincoln Giants players
Philadelphia Giants players
Brooklyn Royal Giants players
Detroit Stars players
Bacharach Giants players
1890 births
1976 deaths
20th-century African-American sportspeople